McLennan, MacLennan and Maclennan are surnames derived from the Scottish Gaelic . Notable people with the surname include:

McLennan spelling 
 Andrew McLennan, New Zealand musician and songwriter better known as Andrew Snoid
 Andrew Robert McLennan (1871–1943), Canadian politician
 Azlan McLennan (born 1975), Australian artist
 Bill McLennan (born 1942), Australian statistician
 Connor McLennan (born 1999), Scottish footballer
 Danny McLennan (1925–2004), Scottish football player and manager
 Donald R. McLennan (1873–1944), American business executive
 Ethel Irene McLennan (1891–1983), Australian botanist and educator
 Freddie McLennan (born 1951), Irish rugby union international
 G. S. McLennan (1883–1929), Scottish bagpipe player
 Gordon McLennan (politician) (1924–2011), Scottish leader of the Communist Party of Great Britain
 Gordon McLennan (rugby league) (1914–1966), Australian rugby league footballer
 Grant McLennan (1958–2006), Australian singer-songwriter with the band The Go-Betweens
 Gregor McLennan (born 1952), British sociologist
 Hector McLennan, Australian suffragist
 Jamie McLennan (born 1971), Canadian ice hockey player
 John McLennan (1821–1893), Canadian politician and businessman
 John Cunningham McLennan (1867–1935), Canadian physicist
 John Ferguson McLennan (1827–1881), Scottish ethnologist
 Kenneth McLennan (1925–2005), American military general
 Margo McLennan (1938–2004), English television actor
 Mark McLennan (born 1991), Scottish footballer
 Neil McLennan (died 1867), Scottish-American settler
 Nick McLennan (born 1988), New Zealand rugby union player
 Paul McLennan ( 2020s), Scottish politician
 Ross McLennan (singer), Australian singer
 Ross McLennan (drummer), Australian drummer
 Scotty McLennan (born 1948), American minister of religion, academic, lawyer and author
 Farquhar McLennan (born 1892), Toronto footballer, CEF - killed in action June 13,1916, Battle of Sanctuary Wood, Belgium

MacLennan or Maclennan spelling 
 Angus MacLennan (1844–1908), Canadian politician
 Carol MacLennan (born 1941), Educator/Academic, New Zealand, China, Hong Kong
 David MacLennan (1937–2020), Canadian biochemist and geneticist
 Hector MacLennan, (1905–1978), Scottish gynaecologist
 Hugh Dan MacLennan, Scottish broadcaster and writer
 James Maclennan (1833–1915) Canadian lawyer, politician, and judge
 John Hugh MacLennan (1907–1990), Canadian author and academic
 Matt MacLennan (born 1976), Canadian film/television writer
 Michael MacLennan (born 1968), Canadian playwright
 Murdoch MacLennan (born 1949), Scottish media executive
 Paul D MacLennan (born 1966), Government adviser and leisure policy maker 
 Robert Maclennan, Baron Maclennan of Rogart (1936–2020), Scottish politician
 Roddy MacLennan (born 1989), Scottish footballer
 Rosie MacLennan, (born 1988), Canadian Olympic trampolinist (Gold)
 Ruari MacLennan (born 1988), Scottish footballer
 Scott MacLennan (born 1987), Scottish cricketer

See also 
 Maclennan, South Island, New Zealand
 McLennan, Alberta, Canada
 McLennan County, Texas, United States
 McLennan Reservation, nature reserve in Massachusetts, United States
 Clan MacLennan, a Scottish clan

English-language surnames
Scottish surnames